The Slickness is the first solo studio album by Prince Po, one half of American hip hop duo Organized Konfusion. It was released on Lex Records in 2004. It peaked at number 53 on the CMJ Top 200 chart.

Production
80 percent of the album was written at Danger Mouse's house in California. The album's production was handled by Jel, Madlib, Danger Mouse, Richard X, J-Zone, and Prince Po himself.

In a 2005 interview, Prince Po stated that his favorite song on the album was "Be Easy". The song was dedicated to the late Matt Doo, who drew the cover art for Organized Konfusion's Stress: The Extinction Agenda and committed suicide years afterwards.

Critical reception

David Jeffries of AllMusic called the album "a victory for all involved." He added: "It's rough and rugged, real and approachable, and you'll have to make plenty of room on your mixtapes for all the highlights within." Jamin Warren of Pitchfork wrote: "Despite a handful of occasional blunders, Po helms an excellent release." DJ Anna of XLR8R commented that "Madlib, Danger Mouse and J-Zone create the background for Po's mesmerizing delivery here, and each track drips with heart and soul as a classic voice collaborates with the best of today's talent." Meanwhile, Dom Passantino of Stylus Magazine wrote: "You just can't help but wonder what it'd be like if he put everything of himself into it."

A single from the album, "Hold Dat", received a favorable review from DJ Shadow. Writing for The New York Times, DJ Shadow said: "Underground rap is finally emerging from its own conservatism and embracing the present, evidenced by the adventurous production on this single from Richard X."

CMJ New Music Monthly placed the album at number 19 on the "20 for 04" list. Tom Dunmore of The Guardian placed it at number 7 on the "Most Beautiful Sleeves of 2004" list.

Track listing

Personnel
Credits adapted from the CD edition's liner notes.

 Prince Po – vocals, production (8, 12), mixing (8, 12)
 Jel – production (1)
 Marty Delafongio – mixing (1–3, 7, 9–11), guitar (3)
 Madlib – production (2, 7, 9)
 Carla Holden – extra vocals (3)
 Danger Mouse – production (3, 6, 11), mixing (6), executive production
 Jemini – vocals (4, 11, 13), co-executive production
 Rell – vocals (4, 13)
 Richard X – production (4, 13), mixing (4, 13), remix (13)
 Stone – vocals (5)
 J-Zone – production (5, 10), mixing (5), vocals (10)
 MF Doom – vocals (6)
 Raekwon – vocals (9)
 J-Ro – vocals (10)
 Cairo – vocals (11)
 Ehquestionmark – artwork
 Maya Hayuk – photography

References

External links
 

2004 debut albums
Prince Po albums
Lex Records albums
Albums produced by Danger Mouse (musician)
Albums produced by Jel (music producer)
Albums produced by J-Zone
Albums produced by Madlib
Albums produced by Richard X